Cubavision International is a Cuban free-to-air television channel run by Cuba's national broadcaster, Cuban Institute of Radio and Television. There is also a national channel called Cubavisión with different contents and its own logo.

Programs
The channel offers the world a variety of programming, the production of which is entirely Cuban. Among the programming highlights are soap operas, music programs, documentaries on flora and fauna, history of the country and various information and opinion.

See also
 Cuban Institute of Radio and Television

References

External links
 Information System of Cuban Television  

Television in Cuba
Government of Cuba
Caribbean cable television networks
International broadcasters
Caribbean culture
Television channels and stations established in 1986
Spanish-language television stations
Mass media in Havana